The Global Food Safety Initiative (GFSI) is a private organization working as a "Coalition of Action" from The Consumer Goods Forum (CGF) bringing together retailers and brand owners (manufacturers) from across the CGF membership operating as multistakeholder governance with objective to create "an extended food safety community to oversee food safety standards for businesses and help provide access to safe food for people everywhere". GFSI's work in benchmarking and harmonisation  aims to foster mutual acceptance of GFSI-recognized certification programmes across the industry with the ambition to enable a “once certified, accepted everywhere” approach.

About
The Global Food Safety Initiative is a business-driven initiative for the continuous improvement of food safety management systems with the ambition to ensure confidence in the delivery of safe food to consumers worldwide. GFSI provides a platform for collaboration between some of the world's leading food safety experts from retailer, manufacturer and food service companies, service providers associated with the food supply chain, international organizations, academia and government.

The initiative was launched in 2000 following a number of food safety crises and pending changes to public laws in the food sector, including EU food law. With legal obligations for their supply chains, and compliance connected to liability, European retailers decided to use private standards to comply with public law requirements.

Since then, experts from all over the world have been collaborating in numerous Technical Working Groups to tackle current food safety issues defined by GFSI stakeholders. Key activities within GFSI include the definition and control of the minimum requirements for food safety certification programmes and a robust benchmarking process. GFSI benchmarking and recognition of existing private standards used for food safety certification programmes with the objective to enhance confidence, acceptance and implementation of third party certification along the entire food supply chain.

Other important current activities include the development of a capacity building programme for small and/or less developed businesses to facilitate their access to local markets and a continuous focus on food safety auditor competence to bring industry experts in collaboration with key stakeholders to a common consensus on the skills, knowledge and attributes that a competent auditor should possess.

In 2020, GFSI launched a programme named ‘The Race to the Top’ (RTTT), with the objective to address specific challenges in relation to lack of trust and confidence in GFSI-recognized certification. This included food safety recalls for food manufacturers with GFSI recognized certificates in the supply chains of their Consumer Goods Forum members. In 2022, IFS reported they had requested the legality of the GFSI race-to-the-top to be reviewed by the Federal Cartel Office under antitrust and competition law.

Benchmarking
Within GFSI, benchmarking is a procedure by which a food safety-related Certification Programme is compared to the GFSI Benchmarking Requirements.

Back in 2000, food safety was a top of mind issue for companies due to several high-profile recalls, quarantines and negative publicity about the food industry. There was also extensive audit fatigue through the industry, as retailers performed inspections or audits themselves or asked a third party to do this on their behalf. These were often carried out against food safety schemes that lacked international certification and accreditation, resulting in incomparable auditing results.

CEOs of global companies came together at The Consumer Goods Forum (CIES at the time) knowing that under the new pending EU food law, “unsatisfactory inspection results should lead to appropriate action”. If they could demonstrate that private standards avoid non-compliance to food law, enforcement authorities would be less likely to prosecute their companies in the event of food safety incidents in their supply chains. The CEOs agreed that consumer trust needed to be strengthened and maintained through a safer supply chain.

GFSI was created to achieve this through the harmonisation of food safety standards that would help mitigate liability exposure for retailers and reduce audit duplication throughout the supply chain. At the time, there was no existing scheme that could be qualified as “global” that could be adopted by all. GFSI therefore chose to go down the route of benchmarking, developing a model that determines equivalency between existing food safety schemes, whilst leaving flexibility and choice in the marketplace.

Benchmarking allows multiple certification programmes with GFSI recognition to enter the marketplace. This created strong competition among Certification Programme Owners (CPOs) who employ large marketing teams with annual growth targets. GFSI benchmarking implies equivalency, however the financial opportunities with certification programme fees resulted in CPOs working to differentiate themselves from their competitors. Companies that have to choose a certification programme often hire consultants to help them decide on the best scheme which causes confusion for many stakeholders. BSI Group describe the problem by comparing food safety standards with "plugs and sockets".

Another obstacle with having to choose a certification programme is that there are no consolidated measures to demonstrate which scheme performs better than others. With examples where companies chose a certification programme without sufficient data or understanding, and after a period of time and food safety failures, decided to switch to a different scheme that was more effective.

This benchmarking model is based on the GFSI Benchmarking Requirements, a multi-stakeholder document that was drafted with input from food safety experts from all over the world, and defines the process by which food safety certification programmes may gain recognition by GFSI and gives guidance to these programmes. GFSI drives continuous improvement through the Benchmarking Requirements, which are updated on a regular basis with global industry input to ensure that the requirements for food safety management programmes are robust.

GFSI is not a CPO and does not undertake any certification or accreditation activities, however it is structured and designed to control the minimum requirements in schemes and therefore influence certification activities. GFSI represents its Consumer Goods Forum members and their steering committee governance have controlling interest to decide upon on the benchmarking requirements. Updates to the benchmarking requirements are reviewed in detail by the legal representatives of Consumer Goods Forum members prior to their approval. Benchmarking requirements do not follow the full consensus process.

The GFSI objectives are to:
 Reduce food safety risks by delivering equivalence and convergence between effective food safety management systems
 Manage cost in the global food system by eliminating redundancy and improving operational efficiency
 Develop competencies and capacity building in food safety to create consistent and effective global food systems
 Provide a unique international stakeholder platform for collaboration, knowledge exchange and networking

Recognition
GFSI has recognized a number of food safety management programmes that fulfill the criteria of the GFSI Benchmarking Requirements. The GFSI Benchmarking Requirements are regularly revised by GFSI to reflect improvements in best practices. GFSI is not a CPO in itself and does not carry out any accreditation or certification activities.

The status of recognition is achieved through a comprehensive benchmarking process. Once a standard has gained formal recognition by the GFSI Steering Committee, this standard is deemed to meet all of the requirements in the GFSI Benchmarking Requirements.

Certification according to a GFSI-recognized certification programme can be achieved through a successful third party audit against any of the following certification programmes, recognized by GFSI:

BRC Global Standard for Food Safety issue 8
BRC Global Standard for Packaging and Packaging Materials issue 6
BRC Global Standard for Agents and Brokers issue 2
BRC Global Standard for Storage and Distribution issue 4
CanadaGAP (Canadian Horticultural Council On-Farm Food Safety Program) v8
Freshcare FSQ Edition 4.2
FSSC 22000 v5.1 (based on the requirements defined in ISO 22000)
Global Aquaculture Alliance Seafood - Seafood Processing Standard Version 5.1
Global Red Meat Standard
GLOBALG.A.P. Integrated Farm Assurance Scheme v5.4
GLOBALG.A.P. Harmonized Produce Safety Standard (HPSS) v1.2
GLOBALG.A.P. Produce Handling Assurance Standard (PHA) v1.2
International Featured Standards IFS Food v7
International Featured Standards IFS Logistics v2.2
International Featured Standards IFS Broker v3
International Featured Standards IFS PACsecure v1.1
Japan Food Safety Management Association JFS-C v 3.0
Japan GAP Foundation ASIAGAP Version 2.3
PrimusGFS Standard Version 3.2
SQF Safe Quality Food Code Edition 9

Up-to-date information on the status of CPO benchmarking and recognition is published to the GFSI website. Some CPOs are registered as nonprofit organizations and other CPOs are for-profit, for example LGC Ltd acquired BRCGS in 2016. In 2019, LGC Ltd was sold to private equity companies Cinven and Astorg.

Conformity assessment

The third party audit of certification programmes with GFSI recognition is performed by accredited certification bodies. GFSI allows certification programmes to choose which conformity assessment requirements that certification bodies must follow. The two options are:

 ISO/IEC 17021 Conformity assessment — Requirements for bodies providing audit and certification of management systems
 ISO/IEC 17065 Conformity assessment — Requirements for bodies certifying products, processes and services

Certification programmes following ISO/IEC 17021 must also meet the requirements of ISO 22003-1 certification of food safety management systems and ISO 22003-2 certification of food safety systems is supplemental to ISO/IEC 17065.

ISO 17021 and ISO 17065 follow ISO/IEC 17000 for vocabulary and general principles, which defines the terms "conformity assessment scheme" and “scheme”. This term is referenced by regulators. In 2018, GFSI introduced a new term, Certification Programme Owner (CPO) to refer to scheme owners. Additionally, GFSI raised an objection to the term “scheme” in the Codex Committee Electronic Working Group (EWG) for Codex draft  Principles and Guidelines for the assessment and use of voluntary Third-Party Assurance programmes. This resulted in a new term, "vTPA", being introduced.

Duplicate terms; “scheme”, “CPO” and “vTPA”, different conformity assessment options; ISO 17021 or ISO 17065 and multiple schemes are examples of fragmentation, which is the opposite of standardization. This can happen when private standards are adopted instead of international standards.

A comparative study of schemes explains an ISO 17065 scheme as product certification, which is prescriptive, and an ISO 17021
scheme as a management certification and non-prescriptive. A paper from Food and Agriculture Organization (FAO), with a  review of literature (Wolff and Scannell, 2008; FAO, 2009a; IIED, 2009; WTO, 2010) highlighted concerns that included private food safety standards being prescriptive rather than outcome focused.

Industry Influence and Motivation
Under the umbrella of GFSI, eight major retailers (Carrefour, Tesco, ICA, Metro, Migros,  Ahold, Wal-Mart and Delhaize) operate as a private sector led Multi-Stakeholder Initiative (MSI), also referred to as Multistakeholder governance. Where major retailers came to a common acceptance of the GFSI benchmarked food safety certification programmes in June 2007.

The motivation for retailer and brand owner influence over benchmarking requirements for CPOs is focused on their legal liability. Where major retailers and food brand owners are held liable for food safety failures in their supply chains. This is discussed in Private food law Governing food chains through contract law, self-regulation, private standards, audits and certification schemes. "BRC is designed to be used as a pillar to help retailers and brand owners with their ‘due diligence’ defence, should they be subject to a prosecution by the enforcement authorities". Under EU food law, retailers and brand owners have a legal responsibility for their brands. Major retailer influence in regards to BRCGS standards is evident in their International Advisory Board (IAB). The BRCGS IAB consists of leading retailers and producers, providing strategic and technical input.

The International Food and Agribusiness Management Review discussed European private food safety standards alter the operations of modern agri-food supply chains allowing the retail sector to exert considerable influence on global food and agricultural supply chains without taking on additional legal and economic liability. Concluding there is no litmus test whether private standards are beneficial or detrimental for global food supply chains.

Concerns around corporate governance in the absence of government regulation were raised by the Institute for Multi-Stakeholder Initiative Integrity, with conclusions that private sector MSIs adopt weak or narrow standards that better serve corporate interests than rights holder interests.

Divided opinion within GFSI 

Brand owners, who are more focused on manufacturing food, and retailers, who are more focused on selling food, have divided opinions on schemes with GFSI recognition. The majority of brand owners who are GFSI members implement FSSC 22000 in their manufacturing facilities. This includes  Barilla, Cargill, Coca-Cola, Danone, Kraft Heinz, Mondelez, PepsiCo and Nestle. FSSC 22000 is based on an international standard (ISO 22000) and following ISO 17021. 
 
Brand owners choose FSSC 22000 for two reasons. Firstly, food manufacturing is a process industry and ISO 17021 is a process based approach to food safety which complements process manufacturing. Secondly, some brand owners have implemented ISO integrated management systems in their manufacturing facilities which are designed for integration with ISO 9001 Quality, ISO 14001 Environmental and ISO 45001 Occupational Health & Safety.

The retailers prefer schemes that follow ISO 17065, a product approach, because they are focused on selling products instead of manufacturing products.

In 2008, brand owners made a proposal to GFSI to adopt ISO 22000, as a single international standard for the reasons of impartiality, independence, consensus and no scheme owner fees. There was strong opposition from scheme owners as their schemes would likely be obsoleted if an international standard was adopted.

Retailers rejected the proposal due to their close relationships with the scheme owners using private standards. For example, BRCGS formerly British Retail Consortium, Safe Quality Food Institute (SQFI) is a division of the Food Marketing Institute, GLOBALG.A.P originally a retail initiative belonging to the Euro-Retailer Produce Working Group and German retailers, Aldi and Lidl preferring to work with the IFS scheme. Promoting ISO 22000 for food and farming would mean reducing the power of global retailers in terms of control over standards.

Brand owners have not raised the proposal for a single international standard again due to possible repercussions. This is because of a power imbalance within the Consumer Goods Forum membership. When there is a dispute or disagreement between a retailer and a brand owner, the retailer can refuse to sell the brand owner products. The retailer and manufacturer relationship is often a fractious one.

GFSI Conference

References

External links
 FSSC 22000
 The Consumer Goods Forum
 The Global Food Safety Initiative

Farm assurance
Food safety
Medical and health organisations based in Belgium